Ancylolomia argenteovittata is a moth in the family Crambidae. It was described by Per Olof Christopher Aurivillius in 1910. It is found in Ethiopia and Tanzania.

References

Ancylolomia
Moths described in 1910
Moths of Africa